Eric Lengyel is a computer scientist specializing in game engine development, computer graphics, and geometric algebra. He holds a Ph.D. in computer science from the University of California, Davis and a master's degree in mathematics from Virginia Tech.

Lengyel is an expert in font rendering technology for 3D applications and is the inventor of the  Slug font rendering algorithm, which allows glyphs to be rendered directly from outline data on the GPU with full resolution independence. Lengyel is also the inventor of the Transvoxel algorithm, which is used to seamlessly join multiresolution voxel data at boundaries between different levels of detail that have been triangulated with the Marching cubes algorithm.

Among his many written contributions to the field of game development, Lengyel is the author of the four-volume book series Foundations of Game Engine Development. The first volume, covering the mathematics of game engines, was published in 2016 and is now known for its unique treatment of Grassmann algebra. The second volume, covering a wide range of rendering topics, was published in 2019. Lengyel is also the author of the textbook Mathematics for 3D Game Programming and Computer Graphics and the editor for the three-volume Game Engine Gems book series.

Lengyel founded Terathon Software in 2000 and is currently President and Chief Technology Officer at the company, where he leads development of the C4 Engine. He has previously worked in the advanced technology group at Naughty Dog, and before that was the lead programmer for the fifth installment of Sierra's popular RPG adventure series Quest for Glory. In addition to the C4 Engine, Lengyel is the creator of the Open Data Description Language (OpenDDL) and the Open Game Engine Exchange (OpenGEX) file format.

Lengyel is originally from Reynoldsburg, Ohio, but now lives in Lincoln, California. He is a cousin of current Ohioan and "Evolution of Dance" creator Judson Laipply.

Games
Eric Lengyel is credited on the following games:

 Formula One Championship Edition (2007), Sony Computer Entertainment America, Inc.
 Heavenly Sword (2007), Sony Computer Entertainment America, Inc.
 Ratchet & Clank Future: Tools of Destruction (2007), Sony Computer Entertainment America, Inc.
 Warhawk (2007), Sony Computer Entertainment America, Inc.
 MotorStorm (2006), Sony Computer Entertainment Incorporated
 Resistance: Fall of Man (2006), Sony Computer Entertainment Incorporated
 Jak 3 (2004), Sony Computer Entertainment America, Inc.
 Quest for Glory V: Dragon Fire (1998), Sierra On-Line, Inc.

Patents
Eric Lengyel is the primary inventor on the following patents:

 Method for rendering resolution-independent shapes directly from outline control points
 Graphics processing apparatus, graphics library module and graphics processing method

References

External links
 List of publications by Eric Lengyel
 Moby Games rap sheet

Year of birth missing (living people)
Living people
University of California, Davis alumni
Video game programmers
Computer graphics professionals
Virginia Tech alumni
People from Columbus, Ohio
People from Reynoldsburg, Ohio
People from Lincoln, California
Sierra On-Line employees
American chief technology officers